The New Zealand women's national cricket team represents New Zealand in international women's cricket. A full member of the International Cricket Council (ICC), the team is governed by New Zealand Cricket. The New Zealand women's national cricket team competed in international cricket for the first time in 1935 when they played against England in a one-off Test at home. They recorded their first Test victory against South Africa in 1972. , they have played 45 Test matches against four different opponentsAustralia, England, India, and South Africa. Out of these, New Zealand have won only 2 matches, against Australia and South Africa; 10 have resulted in a loss, while 33 have ended in a draw.

New Zealand played their first Women's One Day International cricket (WODI) match against Trinidad and Tobago in the 1973 World Cup, in which they won by 136 runs. , they have played 347 WODIs against thirteen different opponents, and have the third most victories (171) for any team in the format. Out of these, they have played 132 matches against arch rivals Australia, recording only 31 wins. New Zealand have been most successful against England, winning 35 times against the team. They have won the Women's World Cup once, in 2000. Since their first Women's Twenty20 International (WT20I) against England in 2004, New Zealand have played 133 WT20I matches . They have recorded 76 wins and have been the third most successful team in the format. New Zealand have recorded the highest number of wins (21) against Australia. They have participated in all editions of the Women's T20 World Cup, and have been the runners-up twice, in 2009 and 2010.

Key

Test cricket

One Day International

Twenty20 International

See also 
 New Zealand national cricket team record by opponent

References 

Cricket records and statistics
record by opponent